Shakthi is a 1980 Indian Malayalam film,  directed by Vijayandand produced by Raghu Kumar. The film stars Jayan, Seema, Srividya and Jagathy Sreekumar in the lead roles. The film has musical score by K. J. Joy. The climax mirror fight sequence was inspired by the 1973 Bruce Lee film Enter the dragon. The movie was in Hit chart.

Cast

Soundtrack
The music was composed by K. J. Joy and the lyrics were written by Bichu Thirumala.

See also
 List of Malayalam horror films

References

External links
 

1980 films
1980s Malayalam-language films
1980s action horror films
1980 horror films
Indian action horror films